Barlborough is a civil parish in the Bolsover district of Derbyshire, England.  The parish contains 29 listed buildings that are recorded in the National Heritage List for England.  Of these, one is listed at Grade I, the highest of the three grades, six are at Grade II*, the middle grade, and the others are at Grade II, the lowest grade.  The parish contains the village of Barlborough and the surrounding area.  The listed buildings include two country houses, smaller houses and associated structures, a church, a village cross, farmhouses and farm buildings, a former almshouse, two monuments in a garden, the walls of a burial ground, a memorial gateway, and a school.


Key

Buildings

References

Citations

Sources

 

Lists of listed buildings in Derbyshire